Yaparla or Yaperla, located on the banks of the River Krishna, is one of the 27 villages of Pebbair Mandal in Wanaparthy district, Telangana, India.

References

Villages in Wanaparthy district